Vladimir Anatolievich Vorobiev (born November 2, 1972) is a Russian former professional ice hockey player. He was selected in the tenth round of the 1992 NHL Entry Draft, 240th overall, by the New York Rangers, and played 33 games in the National Hockey League with the Rangers and Edmonton Oilers between 1997 and 1999. The vast majority of his career, which lasted from 1989 to 2011, was spent in the Russian Super League and its successor, the Kontinental Hockey League (KHL). Internationally Vorobiev played for the Russian national team at the 1995 and 1996 World Championships. After his retirement Vorobiev has worked in coaching roles in the KHL, and currently is an assistant coach with Avtomobilist Yekaterinburg.

Playing career
Vorobiev did not come to North America until the 1996–97 NHL season, five years after he had been drafted.  He split time between the New York Rangers, the Hartford Wolf Pack, and the Binghamton Rangers of the American Hockey League (AHL). He was traded to the Edmonton Oilers and spent two seasons in their system, (playing only two games at the NHL level, despite scoring a goal in both games) before returning to Russia.

Career statistics

Regular season and playoffs

International

Awards and honors
International Hockey League championship: 1995 (with Dynamo)
AHL All-Star Game: 1998
Russian Super League championship: 2005 (with Dynamo)
IIHF European Champions Cup: 2006 (with Dynamo)
Russian Super League championship: 2006 (with Ak Bars)
IIHF European Champions Cup: 2007 (with Ak Bars)

External links
 

1972 births
Living people
Ak Bars Kazan players
Binghamton Rangers players
Edmonton Oilers players
Hamilton Bulldogs (AHL) players
Hartford Wolf Pack players
HC Dynamo Moscow players
Long Beach Ice Dogs (IHL) players
New York Rangers draft picks
New York Rangers players
People from Cherepovets
Russian ice hockey right wingers
Salavat Yulaev Ufa players
Severstal Cherepovets players
Soviet ice hockey right wingers
Sportspeople from Vologda Oblast